Pablo Galdames may refer to:

 Pablo Galdames (footballer, born 1974), Chilean retired football midfielder
 Pablo Galdames (footballer, born 1996), Chilean football midfielder for Genoa